The Florence Y'alls are a professional baseball team based within the Greater Cincinnati region in the city of Florence, Kentucky. The Y'alls are a member of the West Division of the Frontier League, an independent baseball league. Since 2004, they have played their home games at Thomas More Stadium, which is located near Interstates 71 and 75.

The Y'alls franchise has won three Frontier League championships.  However, these titles came when the team existed as the Erie Sailors (1994), Johnstown Steal (1995), and Johnstown Johnnies (2000).  The franchise is currently tied with the Rockford RiverHawks (including years as Portsmouth and Springfield), the Schaumburg Boomers, and the River City Rascals (including years as Zanesville) for the most league championships with each franchise winning three.

History
The team began in Erie, Pennsylvania, as the Erie Sailors in 1994, before moving to Point Stadium in Johnstown, Pennsylvania, in 1995, where it was first known as the Johnstown Steal then the Johnstown Johnnies beginning in 1998. The team won two Frontier League championships in their time in Johnstown, one in 1995 as the Steal and one in 2000 as the Johnnies. The team was sold after the 2002 season and moved to Florence, where it became known as the Freedom.

2003
The team was managed by former major leaguer Tom Browning. The Freedom finished in last place, setting a then-league record with 61 losses, but featured future major leaguer Chris Jakubauskas, who would go 4-9 (5.11 ERA) for the Freedom. The team averaged fewer than 500 fans per game in attendance.

2004
In 2004, the Freedom opened Champion Window Field in Florence.  The park opened on June 18, with the Freedom losing to the Washington Wild Things 10–6 before a crowd of 4,453 fans.  On July 7, after a poor start to the season, manager Tom Browning was fired.  Pete Rose Jr., took over for one game, but quit after making a decision to continue his playing career.  Mike Easler was then hired and finished the season.  The Freedom ended the season with a 31–65 record, finishing in last place for the second consecutive year.

Ownership scandal
In July 2004, shortly after the opening of Champion Window Field, contractors began filing liens against the Freedom, accusing the team of not paying for work done on the stadium.  Eventually, 33 liens totaling US$4.7 million were filed. In August, Fifth Third Bank sued team part-owner Chuck Hildebrant for failing to repay multiple loans taken out to finance the stadium construction.  As part of the lawsuit, it was revealed that Hildebrant had used  of land that he did not own as collateral for the loans, and that he had given the bank a forged document as proof of ownership. Hildebrant was later the subject of a federal white collar crime investigation and sentenced to prison in October 2005. The team was sold in November 2004 to a new ownership group led by Clint Brown, who was not associated with Hildebrant's ownership group.

2005–06
In 2005, former Chillicothe Paints manager Jamie Keefe was signed as the team's new manager.  Keefe led the Freedom to their first winning record (53–42).  The team finished tied for second place in the Frontier League's East Division, missing out on the playoffs by a tiebreaker.  Three Freedom players hit more than 20 home runs in 2005—outfielder Mike Galloway (24), designated hitter Kyle Geswein (24), and first baseman Trevor Hall (23). closer Ted Rowe tied for the league lead in saves with 17.

In 2006, the Freedom had a losing record of 38–50, finishing fifth in the Frontier League East Division.

2007
In 2007, the Freedom again had a sub-.500 record, going 42–54 for the season.  This placed the team third in the East Division.  Outfielder Reggie Watson led the league in batting average (.357) and steals (20), while also winning the Home Run Derby at the 2007 Frontier League All-Star Game, hosted by Florence.  Outfielder Ryan Basham earned the Frontier League Rookie of the Year award, hitting .298 with 17 home runs on the season.

2007 Frontier League All-Star Game
In 2007, Champion Window Field, home of the Freedom, hosted its first Frontier League All-Star Game, with the Freedom's East Division winning 11–3. The Freedom's Reggie Watson had three runs batted in and was named the game's Most Valuable Player.  The game's attendance of 4,483 set a new attendance record for Florence.

2008
In 2008, the team finished with a 47–49 record, missing a playoff spot by four games.  For the first time, the Freedom attracted over 100,000 fans to Champion Window Field, with a total of 106,707 fans for the year.

Uniform changes
In early 2008, the Freedom changed their primary colors from red, white, and blue to black, red, and silver.

2009
In 2009, the Freedom opened against the Midwest Sliders of Ypsilanti at home on May 20. Florence opened 2009 with two major changes—FieldTurf instead of a natural grass surface and a new coaching staff. Toby Rumfield became the new field manager, and Freedom alumni Greg Stone, the Freedom's all-time hit leader, as hitting coach and Bill Browett as pitching coach.

2018
Clint Brown died in January 2018 after 15 years as team president and owner. He was succeeded by his widow, Kim Brown.

2019
Sale of the team to a group of local investors was finalized July 2019. In October 2019, the new owners announced a rebranding of the team for the 2020 season, dropping the name Freedom immediately. The new team name, Florence Y'alls, was announced in January 2020. The team takes its new name from the local Florence Y'all Water Tower.

2020
Due to the COVID-19 pandemic, the Frontier League canceled their 2020 season and did not play.

2021
The Y'alls successfully returned to the playoffs, capturing their fifth division title. However, they lost the first round to the Schaumburg Boomers 3 games to 1.

2022
In March 2022, the Y'alls and Thomas More University partnered to rename the home of the Florence Y'alls Thomas More Stadium. As part of the agreement, the stadium will also become the home of the Thomas More Saints baseball team starting in Spring 2023. Unfortunately, the team missed the playoffs for the first time since 2018.

Seasons

Current Roster

Alumni
Below is a list of Y'alls alumni who have gone on to play MLB-affiliated baseball.  The alumni are sorted by peak level of baseball in which they have participated after playing for Florence.  In total, 20 Y'alls alumni have signed professional contracts after playing for Florence, with five making the major leagues.

As of July 3, 2021:

MLB

AAA

AA

A-Advanced
The following Freedom alumni have advanced as far as Class A-Advanced: Jason Tuttle (Freedom 2003), Kevin Rival (2004), Tim Turner (2004), Mike Galloway (2005), Heath Castle (2006), Johnny Washington (2008)

A
The following Freedom alumni have advanced as far as Class A: James Morrison (Freedom 2004), Steven Pickerell (2005, 2009), Joel Posey (2004-5), Conor McGeehan (2006), Tyler Evans (2007), Neall French (2008)

Short Season A
The following Freedom alumni have advanced as far as Class A-Short Season:

Rookie-Advanced
The following Freedom alumni have advanced as far as Rookie Advanced class: J.D. Foust (Freedom 2004)

Rookie
The following Freedom alumni have advanced as far as Rookie Class: Reggie Watson (Freedom 2006-7), Preston Vancil (Freedom 2010)

Records
Below is a list of Frontier League individual records set by Y'alls players as of the end of the 2009 season.

Individual game
Runs batted in – 9 by Garth McKinney on August 11, 2008 (three-way tie)
Hits – 6 by Matt Cooksey (2006), Nick Salotti (2007), and Garth McKinney (2008) (seven-way tie)
No-hitter – Preston Vancil on July 26, 2009

Single season
Games started (pitching) – 22 by Everett Saul in 2009 (three-way tie)

References

External links

Freedom page at OurSports Central

Frontier League teams
Sports teams in Cincinnati
Professional baseball teams in Kentucky
Florence, Kentucky
Baseball teams established in 2003
2003 establishments in Kentucky